Malagnino is a comune (municipality) in the Province of Cremona in the Italian region Lombardy, located about  southeast of Milan and about  east of Cremona.

Malagnino borders the following municipalities: Bonemerse, Cremona, Gadesco-Pieve Delmona, Pieve d'Olmi, Sospiro, Vescovato.

References

Cities and towns in Lombardy